A penumbral lunar eclipse took place on Wednesday, December 8, 1965. At maximum eclipse, 88% of the Moon's disc was partially shaded by the Earth, which caused a slight shadow gradient across its disc; this subtle effect may have been visible to careful observers. No part of the Moon was in complete shadow. The eclipse lasted 4 hours and 1 minute overall.

Visibility

Related lunar eclipses

Lunar year series

Saros cycle 
Lunar Saros series 144, repeating every 18 years and 11 days, has a total of 71 lunar eclipse events including 20 total lunar eclipses.

First Penumbral Lunar Eclipse: 1749 Jul 29

First Partial Lunar Eclipse: 2146 Mar 28

First Total Lunar Eclipse: 2308 Jul 04

First Central Lunar Eclipse: 2362 Aug 06

Greatest Eclipse of the Lunar Saros 144: 2416 Sep 07

Last Central Lunar Eclipse: 2488 Oct 20

Last Total Lunar Eclipse: 2651 Jan 28

Last Partial Lunar Eclipse: 2867 Jun 08

Last Penumbral Lunar Eclipse: 3011 Sep 04

Half-Saros cycle
A lunar eclipse will be preceded and followed by solar eclipses by 9 years and 5.5 days (a half saros). This lunar eclipse is related to two partial solar eclipses of Solar Saros 151.

See also
List of lunar eclipses
List of 20th-century lunar eclipses

Notes

External links

1965-12
1965 in science